Zyablikovo is a Moscow Metro station in the Zyablikovo District, Southern Administrative Okrug, Moscow. It is located on the Lyublinsko-Dmitrovskaya Line serving as its southern terminus.

The station opened on 2 December 2011.

Zyablikovo is a transfer station to Krasnogvardeyskaya of the Zamoskvoretskaya Line. At the time of opening the transfer, both Krasnogvardeyskaya and Zyablikovo were the terminal stations on their respective lines.

The station is located in the southern part of Moscow, on the border of Zyablikovo and Orekhovo-Borisovo Yuzhnoye districts.

There is a track connection to the Zamoskvoretskaya Line south of this station, where Lyublinsko-Dmitrovskaya Line trains terminate.

Name
The station is named after the village of Zyablikovo, formerly located to the south of the station, which in 1960s became part of Moscow.

References

Moscow Metro stations
Lyublinsko-Dmitrovskaya Line
Railway stations located underground in Russia
Railway stations in Russia opened in 2011